El Jaish Volleyball (Arabic: طائرة الجيش) is a professional volleyball team based in Doha, Qatar. It competes in the Qatari Volleyball League. The team was officially founded in 2007, and has been a dominant force in the QVL since its formation.

Honors
3 official championships.

Domestic
QVA Cup

 Winners (3): 2012, 2013, 2015

International

 Arab Clubs Championship
 Third Place: 2015
 Second Place: 2017

Managerial history
 Ivan Joksimovic (2014, 2016–17)

References

Volleyball in Qatar
El Jaish SC